George Thomas Pattman FRCO (1875 - 10 Aug 1961) was an organist and composer based in England.

Life

He was born in 1875 in Grantham, and studied music under Dr. Haydn Keeton at Peterborough Cathedral.

On leaving Glasgow Cathedral in 1916 he toured the principal music halls for some years and afterwards made records and gave broadcasts. He toured the country with a portable touring organ built by Harrison and Harrison for many of his recitals.

He had a child with soprano singer, Minnie Rigby, who he had worked and collaborated with many times. Pattman had an affair with Minnie whilst she was married to Ernest Rigby, a Doctor of Music, who she had a son with, named Philip.  Minnie divorced Ernest in 1922, before she had her second son.

Appointments

Organist of St Mary's Church, Stamford ca. 1894
Assistant organist of Peterborough Cathedral 1895 - 1896
Organist of All Saints' Church, Scarborough 1896 - 1900
Organist of All Saints' Church, Hessle 1900 - 1901
Organist of Bridlington Priory 1901 - 1904  
Organist of St. Mary's Cathedral, Glasgow 1904 - 1916
Organist of St. Lawrence's Church, Canon's Park, Edgware ca.1941 Organist of Winter Gardens, Blackpool 1924-1925

Compositions

He composed Cinderella (Suite for Full Orchestra).

References

1875 births
1961 deaths
English organists
British male organists
English composers
Fellows of the Royal College of Organists
People from Grantham